Jesse Hart (born August 14, 1989) is an American professional boxer who has challenged twice for the WBO super middleweight title; firstly in 2017 and again in 2018.

Early life and amateur career
Jesse Hart is the son of former Philly middleweight contender Eugene Hart. Eugene trains his son to this day. In 2011, Hart won the National Golden Gloves Championships, and the US National Championships at Middleweight.  He was, at one time, the number one rated amateur boxer at Middleweight in the US. Hart failed to qualify to the 2012 Summer Olympics, losing to Terrell Gausha on countback at the final match of the US Olympic Trials. Hart accumulated an 85-11 record as an amateur.

Professional career

Early career
Hart turned pro in June 2012, signing with promotional outfit Top Rank. Hart won his first 16 fights against mediocre opposition, with 13 wins coming by way of knockout. In May 2015, Hart fought Mike Jimenez in the undercard of Mayweather-Pacquiao. Hart won in dominant fashion, breaking Jimenez down before winning by technical knockout in round 6. With the win, Hart claimed the USBA and the NABO super middleweight titles. Hart defended his North American titles four times against the likes of Dashon Johnson and Andrew Hernandez. Johnson gave Hart an extremely tough fight, despite the former's 19-18-3 record going into the fight. Hart seemed to tire in the latter half of the fight and Johnson dropped Hart in the final round. In the end, Hart took the win by unanimous decision (98-91, 97-92, 95-94).

Ramírez vs. Hart 
Jesse Hart reached an agreement to fight WBO world champion Gilberto Ramírez on September 22, 2017 in Tucson, Arizona. On August 22, the fight was made official and an announcement was made for the venue. The fight was to take place at the Convention Center.

In front of 4,103 fans, Ramírez retained his WBO super middleweight title in a hard-fought battle against a game Hart, which went the 12 round distance. The final judges scorecards were 115-112, 115-112, and 114-113 in favour of Ramírez. He started off strong, dropping Hart in round 2 following a left uppercut, which Hart did not see coming. Hart beat the count and survived the round. In round 4, Hart took tremendous punishment, but managed to stay on his feet. The last 6 rounds saw the fight turnaround in favour of Hart. He landed many power shots to the head of Ramírez, who held his own. Ramírez seemed to have tired out during the closing rounds. Round 11 saw Hart rock Ramírez badly, but not realizing that his legs had given way, thus failing to go for the finish. Had Hart not been dropped in round 2, the fight would have ended via majority decision. After the fight, Ramírez said, "This one was for all the Dreamers, all the people of Mexico and what they are going through with the earthquake. The plan was push, push, push and put a lot of pressure on him and keep him off balance. I wanted to put on a really big body attack every round. There was nothing easy in this fight." Hart was humble in defeat, "I take nothing away from him. He's a good champ. He has my respect. The knockdown was my fault. Zurdo's a really good fighter." Ramírez landed 220 punches from 690 thrown (32%), this included 40 of his 70 power shots thrown. Hart landed 132 of his 497 thrown (27%).

On December 14, 2018, Hart faced Ramirez in a rematch for the WBO super middleweight title. Ramirez was punishing Hart throughout the fight, especially being efficient on the inside. Hart was able to hurt Ramirez back in the final round, but it was too late to make any significant impact on the scoring. In the end, Ramirez won the fight via majority decision, with two judges seeing Ramirez as the winner, 115-113 and 115-113, and one scoring the fight a draw, 114-114.

In his next fight, Hart battled veteran Sullivan Barrera. In what was his debut at light heavyweight, Hart managed to secure a win on points. It was a dirty fight in which referee Jay Nady had to intervene multiple times and threaten the boxers with a point deduction.

Professional boxing record

References

External links
 
 Jesse Hart - Profile, News Archive & Current Rankings at Box.Live

Middleweight boxers
1989 births
Living people
Boxers from Texas
Sportspeople from Dallas
American male boxers